The United Arab Emirates women's national ice hockey team is the women's national ice hockey team in United Arab Emirates.

History 
In February 2018, the team embarked on an International trip to the United States. Their journey began in Washington DC where the team met the Washington Capitals. Their second stop was Chicago, IL. In Chicago the team watched two Blackhawks games, toured the locker rooms, and performed charity work for the community by training the youth players. Fatma Mustapha suffered an injury to the head due to a puck being shot, she did not require stitches and recovered quite fast. From Chicago, they visited Ontario. Upon arrival in Ontario the team had dinner with the UAE Ambassador to Canada.

October- November, 2018. The team travelled to Bangkok to participate in the Land of Smiles Tournament. The result was more of a learning curve than a championship title.

International competitions

IIHF Women's Challenge Cup of Asia
2014 IIHF Women's Challenge Cup of Asia. Finish: 4th in Division I (8th overall)
2017 IIHF Women's Challenge Cup of Asia. Finish: 6th in Top Division
2018 IIHF Women's Challenge Cup of Asia. Finish: 2nd in Division I (6th overall)
2019 IIHF Women's Challenge Cup of Asia. Finish: 2nd in Division I (7th overall)

IIHF Women's Development Cup

Roster 
Roster for the UAE Women's National Team.

Retired Players

References

Ice hockey in the United Arab Emirates
Ice hockey
Women's national ice hockey teams in Asia